

Events

Births

Deaths
 August 31: Konrad von Würzburg (born unknown), German Minnesänger

13th-century poetry
Poetry